Sweet Home (Japanese: スウィートホーム - Hepburn: Suwīto Hōmu), also known as The Mamiya House, is a 1989 Japanese horror film directed by Kiyoshi Kurosawa and produced by Juzo Itami. It was released alongside a video game of the same title that inspired the Resident Evil game series released by Capcom.

Plot 

A small film crew visits the old, abandoned mansion of famous artist Ichirō Mamiya, who left several precious frescos inside his house. The team wants to restore and publish the paintings and film a documentary about Mamiya and his arts. The team includes Kazuo (Shingo Yamashiro), his daughter Emi (Nokko), producer Akiko (Nobuko Miyamoto), photographer Taguchi (Ichiro Furutachi) and art restorer Asuka (Fukumi Kuroda). After they enter the mansion, paranormal events betray the presence of a poltergeist. Soon, Asuka is possessed by the infuriated ghost of Lady Mamiya, Ichirō's wife. The team discovers a makeshift grave where a toddler is buried. The boy is Ichirō and Lady Mamiya's son, who fell into the house's incinerator one day and burned alive. Since then, Lady Mamiya's ghost haunts the mansion, killing any trespassers. In the end, only Kazuo, Emi, and Akiko survive, by reuniting Mamiya with her beloved son, and so giving them peace. When Kazuo, Emi, and Akiko leave the mansion, it begins to collapse.

Cast 
 (Shingo Yamashiro) – Director of the crew. A firm and friendly guy, but anxious and jumpy. Throughout the movie, his affections for Akiko are apparent but he does not reveal his feelings to her. Kazuo is always worried about his daughter Emi.
 (Nokko) – Daughter of Kazuo. She lost her mother as toddler and sees Akiko as her “big sister”. Emi is a student on summer vacation. She assists her father as a guide instead of staying at home alone. Near end of the movie, she is kidnapped by the evil ghost of Mamiya and is rescued by Akiko.
 (Ichiro Furutachi) – Photographer of the crew. He is a womaniser and stalks Asuka. When Asuka is lured away by Mamiya, he follows her.  After being fried in half by the mansion's shadows, he is bludgeoned to death by panicked Asuka.
 (Nobuko Miyamoto) – Producer. She is an extremely self-confident woman with the strongest personality of the crew and the final say. She seems to be aware of Kazuo´s feelings for her, but  pretends to be oblivious.  She is the primary heroine of the movie and saves Emi from Lady Mamiya by pretending to be Emi's dead mother.
 (Fukumi Kuroda) – Reporter. She is also a professional art restorer and therefore responsible for the preservation of the sought-out frescos. Her goal is to get famous from the documentary about Ichirō Mamiya and his paintings.  After killing Taguchi, she is overcome with emotion and does not notice a falling battle axe that smashes straight into her forehead, killing her.
 – A famous artist who disappeared 30 years ago in his mansion. No one knows what exactly happened to him, but his death is likely connected to the suicide of his beloved wife.
 (Machiko Watanabe) – Beloved wife of Ichirō. 30 years ago, she lost her son in an accident which also left her severely disfigured. After the toddler´s death and the loss of her beauty, Mamiya could not cope with the loss and became insane from shattering all of the mirrors in the house to keep from seeing her now ugly visage to gaining the idea of giving her lost son playmates in her madness. In attempts to do so, she kidnapped and killed toddlers by burning them in the incinerator. When caught red-handed by local villagers, who immediately pursue her, she commits suicide by throwing herself into the very furnace her son died in and met the same end as her victims. Her infuriated soul is trapped in the house due to a magical memorial outside of the house. It seems that Mamiya is upset about the circumstances concerning the close proximity of her memorial and her son's grave.

Release
Sweet Home was distributed in Japan by Toho on 21 January 1989.

Reception 

Tom Mes of Midnight Eye noted that the script echoed Robert Wise's The Haunting. He said, "Despite its unsurprising plotting, Sweet Home is action-packed, thrill-packed and effects-packed, resulting in a more than entertaining haunted house ride."

Video game 

Along with the film release, a survival horror role-playing video game with the same title produced by Juzo Itami and published by Capcom was also released in 1989. According to the game's director, Tokuro Fujiwara, he was able to view the film and use what he wanted to as part of the game, and that he "carefully considered how to go about bringing elements from the movie to the game screen". In turn, the Sweet Home video game became the basis for the Resident Evil franchise.

References

Footnotes

Sources

External links 
 
 
 Summary of movie with pictures and synopsis
 The 1989 Japanese B-Movie That Inspired Survival Horror Gaming

1989 horror films
1980s Japanese-language films
1989 fantasy films
Japanese horror films
Japanese haunted house films
Films about filmmaking
Films directed by Kiyoshi Kurosawa
Films set in country houses
Tokusatsu films
1980s Japanese films